The Rice Covered Bridge, also known as the Landisburg Covered Bridge, is a historic wooden covered bridge located at Tyrone Township near Landisburg in Perry County, Pennsylvania. It is a  combination Burr truss and queen post bridge, constructed in 1869.  It crosses Sherman Creek. Its WGCB reference is 38-50-10.

It was listed on the National Register of Historic Places in 1980.

References 

Covered bridges on the National Register of Historic Places in Pennsylvania
Covered bridges in Perry County, Pennsylvania
Bridges completed in 1869
Wooden bridges in Pennsylvania
Bridges in Perry County, Pennsylvania
Tourist attractions in Perry County, Pennsylvania
1869 establishments in Pennsylvania
National Register of Historic Places in Perry County, Pennsylvania
Road bridges on the National Register of Historic Places in Pennsylvania
Burr Truss bridges in the United States